Umbilia is a genus of sea snails, marine gastropod mollusks in the family Cypraeidae, the cowries.

Species
Species within the genus Umbilia include:
Umbilia armeniaca Verco, 1912
Umbilia capricornica Lorenz, 1989
Umbilia hesitata Jousseaume, 1884
Umbilia oriettae Lorenz & Massiglia, 2005
Umbilia petilirostris Darragh, 2002

References

 Wilson B. & Clarkson P. (2004) Australia's spectacular cowries. A review and field study of two endemic genera: Zoila and Umbilia. Odyssey Publishing, El Cajon, California. 396 pp.

External links

Cypraeidae